Burke Gaius Hanford (December 17, 1872 – April 11, 1928) was an American sailor serving in the United States Navy during the Boxer Rebellion who received the Medal of Honor for bravery.

Biography
Hanford was born December 17, 1872, in Toledo, Ohio, and after entering the navy he was sent as a Machinist First Class to China to fight in the Boxer Rebellion.

He died April 11, 1928, and is buried in Greenwood Memorial Park in San Diego.

Medal of Honor citation
Rank and organization: Machinist First Class, U.S. Navy. Born: 17 December 1872, Toledo, Ohio. Accredited to: Ohio. G.O. No.: 55, 19 July 1901.

Citation:

Served with the relief expedition of the Allied forces in China on 13, 20, 21 and 22 June 1900. In the presence of the enemy during this period, Hanford distinguished himself by meritorious conduct.

See also

List of Medal of Honor recipients
List of Medal of Honor recipients for the Boxer Rebellion

References
Inline

General

1871 births
1928 deaths
United States Navy Medal of Honor recipients
United States Navy sailors
People from Toledo, Ohio
American military personnel of the Boxer Rebellion
Boxer Rebellion recipients of the Medal of Honor
Burials at Greenwood Memorial Park (San Diego)